Nikolai Vladimirovich Levichev (born May 28, 1953) is a Russian politician. Since February 24, 2016, he has been a member of Central Election Commission of Russia.

From December 2, 2007, to June 14, 2011, Levichev was the leader of A Just Russia party group in the State Duma. He was elected party leader on April 16, 2011, at the 5th party congress in Moscow. On October 27, 2013, Sergey Mironov took up this post. Nikolai Vladimirovich Levichev did not vote as the only one on December 25, 2017 in the Russian Central Electoral Commission against candidature of Alexei Anatolievich Navalny for Russia's president authority.

Biography
He was born on May 28, 1953, in Pushkin, Leningrad, Soviet Union. His father was a professor of radio engineering in the military school, the author of several textbooks for students. His mother, a mathematician by training, worked as a graphic artist at the publishing house Science. His grandfather was a scholar, graduated from Department of Biology University of St. Petersburg, an honorary citizen of St. Petersburg. He graduated from eighth grade in 410 high school Pushkin, where he studied in the same class with Sergei Mironov, with whom he lived in a doorway. He won in math competitions. 9-10th grade he was in physical and mathematical school No. 239 of Leningrad (one of the top three special schools in the city), where he graduated in 1970.
In 1976, he graduated from the Physics Department of Leningrad State University named after AA Zhdanov. He studied at the same course with Vladimir Churov (since 2007 - Chairman of the CEC ). Then he graduated from graduate school (without defending a thesis).

After graduating from Leningrad State University, he worked as a researcher of the State Optical Institute, Vavilov, and then as the director of summer camp. He was elected to Komsomol committee, then moved to the professional work of the Young Communist League where he was the instructor of the Leningrad City Committee of the Komsomol, the head of the department of culture of the Leningrad regional committee of Komsomol, the instructor, zavsektorom to work with creative youth culture department of the Central Committee of Komsomol.

In 1991, he worked in the Trade Unions. He graduated from the Academy of Social Sciences (AON) at the CPSU Central Committee, and in 1991, took postgraduate studies at the Academy of Social Sciences. He was in the Communist Party until its ban in August 1991. He graduated from the Academy of Civil Service. In 1991, he founded Ltd. Company The-C, then from 1991 to 2002 he was the general director of publishing house Publishing House The-C.

In April 1999, together with Alexander Podlesovym and the corporationsSociety NOYP, JSC STRONEK and JSC Quive established Investment Company (IC) AyBiEych» (IBH), which became the CEO of A. undergrowth.

In 2002, with Sergei Mironov, Alexander Podlesovym one of the founders of the organizing committee of the Russian Party of Life (PCa) and at the founding congress of the Russian Party of Life has been elected co-chair of the National Council of the party.

From 2003 to 2006 he was first deputy chairman of Russian Party of Life and was in the 2004 election campaign team led by C. Mironov on the presidential election.

In 2006, he was elected secretary of the Presidium of the Central Council of the party Fair Russia: Motherland / Pensioners / Life.

In 2007, he was the general director of the magazine Russian Life.
In 2007, he was elected to the State Duma of Federal Assembly of the V convocation in the federal list of candidates nominated by the party of Fair Russia: Motherland / Pensioners / Life .

In October 2009, he headed the list of Fair Russia in the Moscow City Duma elections. Despite the participation in the list of many popular politicians, the party suffered a crushing defeat (5.52%) and was not included in the regional parliament.

At the V Congress of Fair Russia on April 16, 2011, he was elected chairman of the party after the early termination of Sergei Mironov. According to the charter party, the party chairman is engaged in the party and economic work. The chairman of the Chamber of Deputies, which now is Sergei Mironov, may revoke any decision of any organ of the party, including the party chairman.

On June 14, 2011, he resigned as head of the faction Fair Russia: Motherland / Pensioners / Life by transferring their Sergei Mikhailovich Mironov.

On December 21, 2011, at the first plenary session of the State Duma of the VI he was elected deputy chairman of the Duma faction of Just Russia.

Sanctions 
In January 2023 Japan imposed sanctions on Nikolai Levichev.

References

External links
 

1953 births
Living people
People from Pushkin, Saint Petersburg
Saint Petersburg State University alumni
Russian socialists
Communist Party of the Soviet Union members
A Just Russia politicians
Recipients of the Medal of the Order "For Merit to the Fatherland" II class
21st-century Russian politicians
Fifth convocation members of the State Duma (Russian Federation)
Sixth convocation members of the State Duma (Russian Federation)
Russian individuals subject to European Union sanctions